Yavoriv is a city in the Lviv region of western Ukraine which is around 15 kilometers from the Polish border. Yavoriv hosts the administration of Yavoriv urban hromada, one of the hromadas of Ukraine.

Not far from it is the watering-place of Shklo with sulphur springs.

History
The town was first mentioned in written documents in 1436. It received Magdeburg rights in 1569, from Polish King Sigismund II Augustus. Jaworów was a royal town of Poland. It was a favorite residence of king John III Sobieski. In 1675 John III signed the Polish-French Treaty of Jaworów in the town, and there he also received the congratulations from the Pope on his success against the Turks at Vienna (1683), and ratified the formation of the Holy League alliance in 1684.

Until the First Partition of Poland, Jaworów was an important center of commerce, located along main merchant route from Jarosław to Lwów. In 1772 it was annexed by the Habsburg Empire, and included within newly formed Austrian Galicia, where it remained until late 1918. In Galicia, it was the seat of a county, with the population of almost 11,000 (Poles, Jews, Ukrainians and Czechs).

In the immediate post-World War I period, the area of Jaworów witnessed fights of the Polish-Ukrainian War. After the war, the town became part of the Second Polish Republic, where it remained until the joint German-Soviet invasion of Poland, which started World War II, in September 1939. The Jews of the village were merchants or artisans. There was a synagogue. 

During the invasion of Poland, on 14-16 September 1939, Poles defeated invading Germans in the Battle of Jaworów. Despite the victory, the town soon fell to the Soviets, and was under Soviet occupation from 1939 to 1941, and then under German occupation until 1944.

The Jewish population before the German occupation on 26 June 1941 was around 3000. Several hundred Jews were sent to local forced labor camps or to the Belzec extermination camp. A few were transferred to a labour camp in Lviv.

In 1944 the town was re-occupied by the Soviets, and in 1945 it was eventually annexed from Poland by the Soviet Union.

After the war, the Soviet Extraordinary State Commission reported that more than 4900 people, most of them Jews, had been killed in Yavoriv, in addition to those sent to Bełżec. Only about 20 of the town's Jews were thought to have survived.

On 27 May 1947 the UPA blew up the statue of Lenin.

In the decades between the 1960s and 1990s the town was a sulphur mining centre; excavation pits and degenerated lands remain between Yavoriv and Novoiavorivsk.

On 10 December 1991 after the dissolution of the Soviet Union it became part of Ukraine.

On 13 March 2022, during the 2022 Russian invasion of Ukraine, the Russians bombed the military base in Yavoriv. A Russian military spokesperson claimed the attack killed up to 180 foreign mercenaries. The Ukrainian side claimed there were at least 35 dead and 134 injured. The attack was heard in neighbouring Poland.

Notable people
Among notable people born here are Władysław Langner (General of the Polish Army), Stanisław Nowakowski (president of the Polish Scouting and Guiding Association), and mathematician Wawrzyniec Żmurko. Noted Jewish commentator Rabbi David Altschuler was born or served as rabbi at the local synagogue.

Gallery

International relations

Twin towns — Sister cities
Yavoriv is twinned with:

See also
 Battle of Jaworow

References

 Yavoriv, Ukraine
 Official Website Statistics
 Yavorov Jewish History

Cities in Lviv Oblast
Kingdom of Galicia and Lodomeria
Lwów Voivodeship
Shtetls
Cities of district significance in Ukraine
Holocaust locations in Ukraine